The 1905 Maryland Aggies football team represented Maryland Agricultural College (later part of the University of Maryland) in the 1905 college football season. In their first season under head coach Fred K. Nielsen, the Aggies compiled a 6–4 record and were outscored by all opponents, 131 to 66. Coach Nielsen had a full-time job with the State Department while coaching football. Curley Byrd, who went on to be Maryland's head coach from 1911 to 1934 and its university president from 1936 to 1954, played on the 1905 team.

Schedule

References

Maryland
Maryland Terrapins football seasons
Maryland Aggies football